Defence Command, organized as Headquarters during wartime, is the joint command headquarters of the Finnish Defence Forces and a central government agency. Active since 1918, it leads and monitors the execution of the duties prescribed to the Defence Forces, such as the military defence of Finland.

History 

Finland declared independence on 6 December 1917 and by the end of the year, a conflict emerging from the strife between the Reds, led by the Social Democratic Party, and the Whites, led by the conservative-based senate, seemed inevitable. On 16 January 1918, Chairman of the Senate of Finland, Pehr Evind Svinhufvud, appointed General Carl Gustaf Emil Mannerheim as the commander-in-chief of the Government's forces and a few days later Mannerheim met with his senior staff at Hotel Ernst in Vaasa, Finland. The Finnish Civil War commenced on 27 January 1918. Defence Command was established as the Headquarters of White Finland's military in Vaasa by the commander-in-chief's day order number 1 on 2 February 1918.

Organisation

Defence Command is subordinate to the Chief of Defence, commander of the Finnish Defence Forces. The Command is responsible for planning and executing joint operations of the Defence Forces as well as guiding and resourcing the three branches of the military, the Finnish National Defence University, and agencies under its control. It is led by the chief of staff, usually a lieutenant general, with four deputy chiefs of staff focusing on personnel, logistics and armaments, operations, and strategy, respectively. Lieutenant General Timo Kivinen started as chief of staff in June 2016. As of 2015, 328 military and 186 civilian staff served at the Command.

In addition to an executive office and an internal audit unit, Defence Command is divided into ten divisions with a continental staff system:

Executive Office
Internal Audit Unit
Public Information Division
Technical Inspection Division
Personnel Division (J1)
Intelligence Division (J2)
Operations Division (J3)
Logistics Division (J4/J10)
Plans and Policy Division (J5/J8)
C5 Systems Division (J6)
Training Division (J7)
Legal Division (J9)

Infrastructure 
Defence Command is co-located with the Ministry of Defence in the Kaartinkaupunki neighborhood of Helsinki at the Guard's Garrison, designed by architect Carl Ludvig Engel and completed in 1822. The building served as the original garrison of the Guard of Finland and from 1918 to 1938 as the garrison of the White Guard. It was destroyed during the Continuation War in the February 1944 bombing of Helsinki and rebuilt after the wars as well as supplemented in the 1960s with additional buildings designed by architects Viljo Revell and Heikki Castrén.

See also 
 Foreign relations of Finland
 Military strategy

References

External links 
 Finnish Defence Forces official website
 Ministry of Defence official website

Military of Finland
Finland
Government of Finland
Government agencies established in 1918
1918 establishments in Finland